Janville-sur-Juine (literally Janville on Juine) is a commune in the Essonne department in Île-de-France in northern France.

Inhabitants of Janville-sur-Juine are known as Janvillois.

Geography
The village lies on the right bank of the river Juine, which forms all of the commune's northern border.

See also
Communes of the Essonne department

References

External links

Mayors of Essonne Association 

Communes of Essonne